Bulldog Drummond Comes Back is a 1937 American adventure mystery film starring John Howard as the English adventurer/crime-solver Bulldog Drummond. John Barrymore plays Drummond's friend Colonel Nielsen and is actually Top-billed in the picture. The supporting cast includes Drummond series regular Louise Campbell, Reginald Denny, E.E. Clive, and J. Carrol Naish. The film was directed by Louis King.

Plot
Phyllis Clavering, the girlfriend of Captain Drummond, is kidnapped. Murderer Mikhail Valdin and his sister, Irena Soldanis, seek revenge for the death of her husband, sent to the gallows a year ago through Drummond's actions. Though Valdin could shoot Drummond, he informs the captain that it would be too quick. Drummond and his friend Colonel Nielsen are instead given a series of riddles to solve.

Cast

References

External links
 
 
 
 
 
 

Films based on Bulldog Drummond
1937 films
American mystery thriller films
1930s English-language films
American black-and-white films
1937 adventure films
Films directed by Louis King
1930s mystery thriller films
American adventure films
Films set in London
Paramount Pictures films
Films based on British novels
1930s American films